David Ikin (born 18 February 1946) is an English former footballer who played as a goalkeeper for Port Vale and Winsford United in the 1960s.

Career
Ikin joined Jackie Mudie's Fourth Division side Port Vale in July 1965 and made his debut in a 3–0 defeat by Aldershot at the Recreation Ground on 12 February 1966. Six days later he played in a 3–0 defeat to Stockport County at Edgeley Park. These were his only appearances of the 1965–66 season, and he left Vale Park for Winsford United on a free transfer in May 1966.

Career statistics
Source:

References

Footballers from Stoke-on-Trent
English footballers
Association football goalkeepers
Port Vale F.C. players
Winsford United F.C. players
English Football League players
1946 births
Living people